Dactyloceras is a genus of moths of the family Brahmaeidae.

Species
Subgenus Shinocksiceras Bouyer, 2002
Dactyloceras barnsi Joicey & Talbot, 1924
Dactyloceras bramarbas Karsch, 1895
Dactyloceras canui Bouyer, 2002
Dactyloceras catenigera Karsch, 1895
Dactyloceras ducarmei Bouyer, 2002
Dactyloceras karinae Bouyer, 2002
Dactyloceras maculata Conte, 1911
Dactyloceras murphyi Bouyer, 2012
Dactyloceras neumayeri Pagenstecher, 1885
Dactyloceras noellae Bouyer, 2006
Dactyloceras ocelligera Butler, 1889
Dactyloceras ostentator Hering, 1927
Dactyloceras richinii Berio, 1940
Dactyloceras swanzii (Butler, 1871)
Dactyloceras tridentata (Conte, 1911)
Dactyloceras vingerhoedti Bouyer, 2005
Dactyloceras widenmanni Karsch, 1895
Subgenus Dactyloceras
Dactyloceras lucina (Drury, 1782)
Dactyloceras nebulosum Brosch, Naumann & Meister, 2002

References

Brahmaeidae
Macrolepidoptera genera